Sanqoz-e Vosta (also Romanized as Sanqoz-e Vosţá; also known as Sanqor-e Vasaţ) is a village in Miankuh Rural District, Chapeshlu District, Dargaz County, Razavi Khorasan Province, Iran. At the 2006 census, its population was 40, in 6 families.

References 

Populated places in Dargaz County